Admetus or Admetos may refer to:

Mythology 
 Admetus, mythological king of Pherae in Thessaly
 Admetus (mythology)

People 
 Admetus (epigrammatist), 2nd-century Greek poet
 Admetus of Epirus (before 450 BC), king of the Molossians
 Admetus of Macedon (died 332 BC), General of Alexander the Great

Other uses 
 Admetus (horse), a French-bred Thoroughbred racehorse
 Admeto, an opera of Handel